Jorge Rafael Padilla (born August 11, 1979 in Río Piedras, Puerto Rico) is a former Major League Baseball outfielder. He was first called up to the major leagues on August 5, 2009.

Professional career

Minor league journeyman: 1998 to 2008
Padilla was selected by the Philadelphia Phillies in the third round of the 1998 Major League Baseball Draft. He soon made his debut with the Rookie-level Martinsville Phillies. He batted .356 with five homers and 25 RBIs in 23 games.

In  Padilla split his season between the Class A Piedmont Boll Weevils, where in 44 games he hit .208 with three homers and 17 RBIs, and the Short-season Batavia Muckdogs, where in 65 games he hit .252 with three homers and 30 RBIs.

With the Class A Clearwater Phillies Padilla ranked ninth in the South Atlantic League in batting with a .305 average.

He spent the entire  season with Class A Advanced Clearwater, hitting .260 with 16 homers, 66 RBIs and 23 stolen bases in 100 games.

In  Padilla was promoted for the Double-A Reading Phillies. He hit .256 with seven homers, 65 RBIs and 32 stolen bases in 127 games.

He suffered a hand injury in late June, which required season-ending surgery.

Padilla started the  season with Clearwater after missing two months with an injury. He soon rejoined Triple-A Scranton-Wilkes Barre. He got off to a great start hitting .317 in his first 19 games but fell apart in his final 30 games batted .223.

In  Padilla spent the entire year with the Double-A Binghamton Mets marking his first season in the New York Mets organization. He hit .295 with 10 homers and 54 RBIs in 129 games. Padilla finished fourth in the Eastern League in hitting and third in hits with 142. He was selected for the Eastern League All-Star team.

He spent the  season with the Double-A Wichita Wranglers in the Kansas City Royals organization. He hit .336 with 10 homers, 51 runs scored and 49 RBIs in 69 games and was soon promoted to the Triple-A Omaha Royals where he hit .291 with six homers, 27 runs scored and 20 RBIs in 55 games.

Padilla hit .330 with a homer, 25 runs scored and 14 RBIs in 33 games with the Double-A Harrisburg Senators. This marked his first season in the Washington Nationals organization.

He started the  season with the Syracuse Chiefs.

A chance with the Nationals: 2009
Padilla was called up to the Nationals after right fielder Austin Kearns was placed on the disabled list with a right thumb contusion. Padilla earned the promotion after hitting .367 with four home runs and 21 RBIs for the Triple-A Syracuse Chiefs. The right-handed hitter stated his reason for his high batting average was his ability to hit the ball to the opposite field.

On August 22, Padilla got his first start in left field for the Nationals.

After becoming a free agent following the 2009 season, Padilla signed with the Toronto Blue Jays. On June 18, 2010, he was traded to the New York Mets for future considerations. On November 10, 2010, Padilla became a minor league free agent.

The San Diego Padres signed free-agent OF Jorge Padilla (Marlins) to a minor league deal Wednesday, May 30.

Was released from San Diego Padres Organization July 3, 2012

Personal life
Padilla was once married to Sheila Gonzalez. Padilla is a 1998 graduate of Florida Air Academy in Melbourne, Florida. He was first-team All-State in baseball in 1997–98 and Player of the Year.

See also
 List of Major League Baseball players from Puerto Rico

Notes

References 

1979 births
Living people
Baseball players at the 2019 Pan American Games
Batavia Muckdogs players
Binghamton Mets players
Broncos de Reynosa players
Buffalo Bisons (minor league) players
Clearwater Phillies players
Clearwater Threshers players
Columbus Clippers players
Harrisburg Senators players
Jacksonville Suns players
Las Vegas 51s players
Major League Baseball outfielders
Major League Baseball players from Puerto Rico
Mexican League baseball center fielders
Mexican League baseball left fielders
Martinsville Phillies players
New Orleans Zephyrs players
Omaha Royals players
Pan American Games gold medalists for Puerto Rico
Pan American Games medalists in baseball
People from Río Piedras, Puerto Rico
Piedmont Boll Weevils players
Puerto Rican expatriate baseball players in Mexico
Reading Phillies players
Scranton/Wilkes-Barre Red Barons players
Syracuse Chiefs players
Tucson Padres players
Washington Nationals players
Wichita Wranglers players
Medalists at the 2019 Pan American Games